This is a list of firearm cartridges which have bullets in the  to  caliber range.

Length refers to the cartridge case length
OAL refers to the overall length of the cartridge
Bullet refers to the diameter of the bullet

All measurements are in millimetres (with inches in parentheses).

Pistol cartridges

Revolver cartridges

Rifle cartridges

See also
 .410 bore

References

Pistol and rifle cartridges